Valpre is a bottled spring water by The Coca-Cola Company available in South Africa.  The brand is bottled in two forms, "still" and "sparkling". Coca-Cola South Africa announced on the 12 October 2009 that it will establish a new Valpre Water Bottling plant in Heidelberg, Gauteng.

It is claimed to be brought to the consumer just as they found it in the Fricona Valley, in the highlands of northern KwaZulu-Natal.

References

Bottled water brands
Coca-Cola brands